The 2016 Saint Barthélemy Championship was the 13th season of the competition. The championship was won by FC Gustavia.

References

Saint Barthélemy football competitions
Saint Barthélemy Championships
Ligue